The 1984 Maui Invitational Tournament was the inaugural edition of an early-season college basketball tournament that was played November 23–24, 1984, and was part of the 1984-85 NCAA Division I men's basketball season. It was the first title for the program and its head coach Joe Mullaney.

Bracket

References

Maui Invitational Tournament
Maui Invitational